The 1946 Belmont Stakes was the 78th running of the Belmont Stakes. It was the 40th Belmont Stakes held at Belmont Park in Elmont, New York and was held on June 1, 1946. With a field of three horses, Assault, the winner of that year's Kentucky Derby and Preakness Stakes won the 1 –mile race (12 f; 2.4 km) by 3 lengths over Natchez.

With the win, Assault became the seventh Triple Crown champion.

Results

 Scratched: Cedar Creek, Manor Lad, Windfields

 Winning breeder: King Ranch; (TX)

Payout

 Based on a $2 wager.

External links 
BelmontStakes.com

References

Belmont Stakes races
Belmont Stakes
Belmont Stakes
Belmont Stakes